Mary Lucretia Creighton (February 3, 1834 – January 23, 1876) was born Mary Lucretia Wareham in Dayton, Ohio. Creighton was a philanthropist who left a bequest of $200,000 in her will to found Creighton University in honor of her husband, Omaha, Nebraska pioneer banker Edward Creighton.

Biography
Edward's brother John married Sarah Emily Wareham of Dayton, Ohio; through that couple, Edward met his future wife, Sarah's sister, Mary Lucretia. They married October 7, 1856, and two years later had their only child, Charles David. He died at age five in 1863.

Legacy
Creighton University presents an annual award called the Mary Lucretia and Sarah Emily Creighton Award. Administrators, students, faculty, and staff members who create an environment supportive of achievement for women, who has encouraged women faculty, administrators, staff or students in the development and use of their talents, or who has served as a role model of accomplishment for women. Formerly called the Mary Lucretia Creighton Award, it was renamed in honor of Mary Lucretia and Sarah Emily Creighton. Sarah Emily was instrumental in the founding of St. Joseph's Hospital.

See also
 History of Omaha

References

External links
 The Creightons: Builders of the West.

Creighton family
1834 births
1876 deaths
American philanthropists
Creighton University
People from Dayton, Ohio
People from Omaha, Nebraska